Anne Barton (March 20, 1924 – November 27, 2000) was an American film and television actress.

She appeared in the films Destination 60,000 (1957), Pawnee (1957), The Green-Eyed Blonde (1957), The Left Handed Gun (1958), The Comancheros (1961), What Ever Happened to Baby Jane? (1962), The Way West (1967) and The Great Northfield Minnesota Raid (1972), among others.

TV appearances included Leave It to Beaver (she played Eddie Haskell's mother), The Twilight Zone, Thriller, Perry Mason, Death Valley Days, Gunsmoke, Have Gun-Will Travel, and “Hawaii Five-0”.

Barton was married to actor Dan Barton. She died on November 27, 2000, in Los Angeles, California at age 76.

Filmography

Partial Television
1968 "Green Acres" Mrs. Mullen (S3E28)

References

External links

 
 

1924 births
2000 deaths
20th-century American actresses
American film actresses
People from Evansville, Indiana